Lukáš Letenay (born 19 April 2001) is a Slovak professional footballer who currently plays for MŠK Púchov as a forward, on loan from AS Trenčín.

Club career

AS Trenčín
Letenay made his Fortuna Liga debut for AS Trenčín against Pohronie on 30 November 2019 during a home 0:1 loss. Letenay came on in the last ten minutes to replace Ryan Koolwijk, with the final score already set in the first half by András Mészáros.

References

External links
 AS Trenčín official club profile 
 
 Futbalnet profile 
 

2001 births
Living people
Footballers from Bratislava
Slovak footballers
Slovakia youth international footballers
Association football forwards
AS Trenčín players
MŠK Púchov players
Slovak Super Liga players